Thomas Cooley (1740–1784) was an English-born Irish architect who came to Dublin from London after winning a competition for the design of Dublin's Royal Exchange in 1768.

Early years
Cooley was born to William and Mary Cooley in London and began his career as a carpenter apprenticeship in 1756 with interest in architecture.

Cooley worked as a draughtsman and clerk to the architect and engineer Robert Mylne (1733–1810), while the latter was building Blackfriars Bridge in London, between 1761 and 1769. In 1769, he won the competition to design a new Royal Exchange in Dublin, and the building, now the City Hall, was completed in 1779. The design shows the influence of Mylne's work, which in turn derived from French neoclassical architecture.

Architecture career and Ireland

Arriving in Ireland in 1768, Cooley built several public buildings in Dublin in the neoclassical style. Together with James Gandon (1743–1823), Cooley was part of a small school of architects influenced by Sir William Chambers (1723–1796).

Cooley also designed Newgate Prison (demolished 1893), the Marine School, and a chapel, all in Dublin. In 1768 he began another public building in the city, but on his death at the age of 44 in Dublin, the project was handed over to Gandon, who completed it, to his own design, as the Four Courts.

Outside Dublin, Cooley built a number of country houses including Caledon (1779), for James Alexander, later Earl of Caledon. He designed several buildings in Armagh, including the Archbishop's Palace (now the town hall), and the public library.

List of buildings designed or built by Cooley

This is an incomplete list of buildings from Cooley:

 St Patrick's Cathedral, 1769 – survey
 Headfort, 1769–1771
 Palace Demesne, Archbishop's Palace – remodelling
 Sir Rogerson's Quay– Royal Hibernian Marine School, 1770–1773
 Chapel at Phonenix Park, Royal Hibernian Military School, 1771
 Abbey Street Public Library, 1771
 Ardbraccan, 1772–1775
 Newgate Prison, 1773–1781
 Royal School, College Hill, 1774
 Bishop's Palace, Killaloe, 1774
 Royal Hospital, South Kilmainham, 1775–1777
 The Four Courts, Inn's Quay, 1768–1802
 Enlargement of the Linenhall, 1784

Personal
From 1781 Cooley remained in Ireland until the end of his life. He was survived by a son William and a daughter and was predeceased by his wife.

References

Sources
Richardson, Albert E. (2001) Monumental Classic Architecture in Great Britain and Ireland. Courier Dover Publications. 
Summerson, John (1993) Architecture in Britain: 1530-1830 9th edition. Yale. 
Jacqueline O'Brien with Desmond Guinness (1994), Dublin: A Grand Tour, Weidenfeld and Nicolson, London.

18th-century Irish architects
18th-century English architects
18th-century Anglo-Irish people
Architects from London
Architects from Dublin (city)
1740 births
1784 deaths